Artur Rifovich Valikayev (born 8 January 1988) is a Russian professional footballer.

Club career
He made his professional debut in the Russian First Division in 2007 for FC Sodovik Sterlitamak.

On 2 March 2019, Valikayev joined Dordoi Bishkek on trial, being unveiled as a new signing for the club on 5 March 2019.

References

External links

1988 births
Living people
People from Sterlitamak
Russian footballers
Russia under-21 international footballers
Association football midfielders
FC Sodovik Sterlitamak players
FC Ural Yekaterinburg players
FC Nizhny Novgorod (2007) players
FC Rostov players
FC Spartak Moscow players
FC Amkar Perm players
FC Shinnik Yaroslavl players
FC Ufa players
FC Tom Tomsk players
FC Khimik Dzerzhinsk players
FC Sakhalin Yuzhno-Sakhalinsk players
Nõmme Kalju FC players
Olympiakos Nicosia players
FC Dordoi Bishkek players
FC Dynamo Bryansk players
FC Smorgon players
Russian Premier League players
Meistriliiga players
Cypriot First Division players
Russian expatriate footballers
Expatriate footballers in Estonia
Expatriate footballers in Cyprus
Expatriate footballers in Kyrgyzstan
Expatriate footballers in Belarus
Sportspeople from Bashkortostan
Russian expatriate sportspeople in Cyprus
Russian expatriate sportspeople in Belarus
Russian expatriate sportspeople in Estonia